Allens Boots is a retail store in Austin, Texas, that specializes in western wear. 

The store offers items such as cowboy boots, hats, jeans, and shirts.

History
Allens Boots opened its doors in 1977; the big, red boot above the entrance has since made the store easy to spot among the many other boutiques and shops along South Congress Avenue.

Allens Boots is a popular shopping destination for famous musicians, movie stars, and celebrities.

References

External links
Official Website
Replica Sneakers

Boots
Culture of Austin, Texas
Companies based in Austin, Texas